Vernon County Courthouse may refer to:

Vernon County Courthouse (Missouri), Nevada, Missouri
Vernon County Courthouse (Wisconsin), Viroqua, Wisconsin